St Clare's School is a coeducational private day school, located in the village of Newton (near Porthcawl), in Bridgend County Borough, South Wales. St. Clare's is a non-selective independent school attended by pupils aged 2 1/2 years through to 18. The school provides preparatory, secondary and tertiary education leading to GCSE and A-level qualifications. Formerly a Roman Catholic school, it is now owned and operated by the Cognita Group.

History
In 1938, the Rev. Canon James of Newton invited the Sisters of St Clare from Newry, County Down, Northern Ireland to open a secondary day-school for girls in their new convent at the Clevis in Newton. The school was originally titled Sacred Heart School.

Pupil numbers swelled during the war years as evacuees joined the school as boarders. Therefore, the decision was taken to form two schools – Preparatory and Senior. Both the schools were renamed after St. Clare. Boys were admitted to the school, but only the Preparatory School and boarding ceased in the early 1990s due to falling numbers. In May 2006 the Sisters of St Clare took the decision to retire and the school was sold to Cognita Schools. The name became simply St Clare's School.

The school today
St. Clare's is a co-educational, non-selective day school for children aged 2 1/2 – 18 years. The school is divided into 4 departments: Nursery school (children ages 2 1/2 – 4); Junior School (ages 4 – 11); Senior School (ages 11–16); and Sixth form (ages 16 – 18).

2012 exam results
In 2012, 100% of St. Clare's pupils gained 6 or more GCSE pass grades at A* - C with 50% of the overall grades at A* / A. At A level there was a 98% overall pass rate. Over 55% of pupils achieved A*-B grades with a third of pupils gaining an A*-A grade.

See also
 Cognita

References

External links
 
 Cognita Schools' Website

Private schools in Bridgend County Borough
Educational institutions established in 1938
Cognita
1938 establishments in Wales